Serkan Yağcı (born May 25, 1984) is a Turkish karateka competing in the kumite -75 kg division. He is a member of the İstanbul Büyükşehir Belediyesi S.K.

Achievements
2013
 XVII Mediterranean Games - June 28, Mersin TUR - kumite -75 kg
  European Championships - May 9–12, Budapest HUN - kumite -75 kg

2009
  European Championships - May 8, Zagreb CRO - kumite -75 kg

2008
  European Championships - May 2, Tallinn EST - kumite -70 kg

2007
  European Championships - May 4, Bratislava SVK - kumite -70 kg 
  Italian Open - March 31, Monza ITA - kumite -70 kg

2006
  World University Championships - August 6, New York City USA - kumite Open 
  World University Championships - August 6, New York City USA - kumite -70 kg

References

Living people
Turkish male karateka
Sportspeople from Istanbul
Istanbul Büyükşehir Belediyespor athletes
1984 births
Mediterranean Games gold medalists for Turkey
Competitors at the 2013 Mediterranean Games
Mediterranean Games medalists in karate
21st-century Turkish people